Arabshah may refer to:
 Arabshah-e Daraq, East Azerbaijan Province
 Arabshah-e Khargushan, East Azerbaijan Province
 Arabshah Khan, East Azerbaijan Province
 Arabshah, Isfahan
 Arabshah, Takab, West Azerbaijan Province
 Arabshah, Takht-e Soleyman, Takab County, West Azerbaijan Province

See also
 Arabshahids, a dynasty of the Khanate of Khiva